Motilal Rajvansh (4 December 1910 – 17 June 1965) was an Indian actor and the winner of Filmfare Best Supporting Actor Award for Devdas (1955) and Parakh (1960). He is credited with being among Hindi cinema's first natural actors.

He also directed the film Chhoti Chhoti Baten (1965), but died before its release. At the 13th National Film Awards, it won the award for Certificate of Merit for the Third Best Feature Film and he posthumously won the Certificate of Merit for the Best Story Writer.

Early life and background 
Born in Shimla on 4 December 1910, Motilal came from a distinguished family. His father was a renowned educationist, who died when Motilal was one year old. He was brought up by his uncle who was a well-known civil surgeon in Uttar Pradesh. At first, Motilal was sent to an English school at Shimla and later, in Uttar Pradesh (UP). Thereafter, he shifted to Delhi where he continued with school and college.

Acting career 
Motilal Rajvansh said of his screen career with characteristic humour:

After leaving college, Moti came to Bombay to join the Navy, but he fell ill and could not appear for the test. Fate had other choices charted out for him. One day, he went to see a film shoot at Sagar Studios, where director K. P. Ghosh was shooting. Motilal, even then, was quite the man about the town and he caught Ghosh's eye. In 1934 (aged 24), he was offered the hero's role in Shaher Ka Jadoo (1934) by the Sagar Film Company. He later featured in several successful social dramas alongside Sabita Devi, including Dr. Madhurika (1935) and Kulvadhu (1937). He  worked with Mehboob Khan in Jagirdar (1937) and Hum Tum Aur Woh (1938) under the Sagar Movietone banner, in Taqdeer (1943) for Mehboob Productions, and Kidar Sharma's Armaan (1942) and Kaliyan (1944). He also acted in S. S. Vasan's film Paigham (1959) (Gemini Studios), and Raj Kapoor's Jagte Raho (1956).

In 1965, he also acted in the Bhojpuri film Solaho Singar Kare Dulhaniya.

Perhaps the role for which he received the most critical appreciation was that of the gentleman crook in S. S. Vasan's adaptation of R K Narayan's book Mr Sampat (1952). He is most remembered for his role as "Chunni Babu" in Bimal Roy's Devdas (1955), for which he won his first Filmfare Best Supporting Actor Award. Actor Naseeruddin Shah once described him as one of three all-time best actors of Hindi cinema, others being Balraj Sahni and Yakub.

Personal life
Motilal was very suave and polished, and moved in high society, though towards the end of his life he was in financial difficulty. Although a thorough gentleman, he enjoyed gambling and races, and died almost penniless in 1965.

He was in a relationship for several years with the actress Nadira. He was later involved with actress Shobhna Samarth after she separated from her husband, and he played Samarth's real-life daughter Nutan's father in Hamari Beti, Shobhana's launch movie for Nutan. He also played her guardian in Anari, though this time the role had a villainous touch to it.

Tribute
Amitabh Bachchan wrote in the foreword of The Hundred Luminaries of Hindi Cinema: "Not much has been written in praise of a great and very natural actor. He (Motilal) was greatly ahead of his times. Were he alive today his sheer versatility would have ensured a place for him even now. In fact, he would be doing much better than many of us."

Filmography

Actor 

 Yeh Zindagi Kitni Haseen Hai (1966)
 Chhoti Chhoti Baten (1965)
 Waqt (1965)
 Solaho Singar Kare Dulhaniya (Bhojpuri) (1965)
 Ji Chahta Hai (1964)
 Leader (1964)
 Yeh Rastey Hain Pyar Ke (1963)
 Asli-Naqli (1962)
 Parakh (1960)
 Anari (1959)
 Paigham (1959)
 Ab Dilli Dur Nahin (1957)
 Jagte Raho (1956)
 Devdas (1955)
 Dhoon (1953)
 Ek Do Teen (1953)
 Apni Izzat (1952)
 Mr. Sampat (1952)
 Hamari Beti (1950)
 Hanste Aansoo (1950)
 Ek Thi Ladki (1949)
 Lekh (1949)
 Gajre (1948)
 Mera Munna (1948)
 Aaj Ki Raat (1948)
 Do Dil (1947)
 Phoolwari (1946)
 Pehli Nazar (1945)
 Dost (1944)
 Mujrim (1944)
 Raunaq (1944)
 Umang (1944)
 Aage Kadam (1943)
 Taqdeer (1943)
 Tasveer (1943)
 Armaan (1942)
 Pardesi (1941)
 Sasural (1941)
 Achhut (1940)
 Holi (1940)
 Aap Ki Marzi (1939)
 Sach Hai (1939)
 Hum Tum Aur Woh (1938)
 Teen Sau Din Ke Baad (1938)
 Captain Kirti Kumar (1937)
 Jagirdar (1937)
 Kulvadhu (1937)
 Kokila (1937)
 Dilawar (1936)
 Do Diwane (1936)
 Jeevan Lata (1936)
 Lagna Bandhan (1936)
 Do Ghadi Ki Mauj (1935)
 Dr. Madhurika (1935)
 Silver King (1935)
 Shaher Ka Jadoo (1934)
 Vatan Parasta (1934)

Director

 Chhoti Chhoti Baten (1965)

References

External links 
 
 
 http://timesofindia.indiatimes.com/entertainment/A-trip-down-memory-lane-with-actor-Motilal/articleshow/47697183.cms

1910 births
1965 deaths
Indian male film actors
Male actors in Hindi cinema
People from Shimla
20th-century Indian male actors
Hindi-language film directors
Male actors from Himachal Pradesh
Film directors from Himachal Pradesh
20th-century Indian film directors
Best Story National Film Award winners
Filmfare Awards winners